About Love is a 1970 Soviet romantic drama film directed by Mikhail Bogin.

Plot 
Thirty-year-old Galina is smart, charming and beautiful. She works as a restorer in the workshop of the Leningrad Catherine Palace and, it would seem, was created for love. But there is no real feeling and no.

Cast 
 Victoria Fyodorova as Galya
 Sergey Dreyden as Mitya  
 Eleonora Shashkova as Vera
 Vladimir Tikhonov as Petya  
 Oleg Yankovsky as Andrei
 Valentin Gaft as Nikolai
 Stanislav Churkin as Little engineer
 Nina Mamaeva as Polina Ivanovna
 Elena Solovey as Rita
 Eleonora Aleksandrova as Nina   
 Bibi Andersson as Nikolai's girfriend
 Lyudmila Arinina as episode

History of Creation
The real prototype of the main character is the sculptor-restorer Liliya Mikhailovna Shvetskaya.

References

External links 
 

1970 films
1970s Russian-language films
Soviet romantic drama films
Gorky Film Studio films
1970 romantic drama films